Maria Donatucci (born 1954) is an American politician who served as a member of the Pennsylvania House of Representatives from the 185th district, which includes parts of Delaware and Philadelphia counties. She was elected in February 2011.

Early life and education

Donatucci was born and raised in South Philadelphia and is the only child of stand-up comedian Phil Jaye and Jean Patelmo. She graduated from Philadelphia High School for Girls in 1972 and attended Philadelphia College of Art, Philadelphia Community College, Pierce Junior College, and Temple University.

Career 
Donatucci has worked in various positions for the Philadelphia Redevelopment Authority during the 1970s and the 1980s, as well as working as an adjudicator for Philadelphia's Bureau of Administrative Adjudication. She has also served as a board member for the Lions Club, from which she received the Melvin Jones Fellow Award for Outstanding Community Service in 2007.

Pennsylvania House

Donatucci was elected to the House in 2011 in a special election after the death of her husband, Robert.

She served on the Aging & Adult Older Services, Urban Affairs, and Veterans Affairs & Emergency Preparedness committees in the House.

Election results

Personal life 
In 1984, Donatucci married Robert Donatucci, who was then a state representative from the 185th district. They had two children together, Dierdre and Thomas.

References

Politicians from Philadelphia
Democratic Party members of the Pennsylvania House of Representatives
Temple University alumni
Women state legislators in Pennsylvania
1954 births
Living people
21st-century American politicians
21st-century American women politicians